Anyways (also written with an ellipsis, as Anyways...) is the debut studio album by American rapper Young Nudy. It was released on February 24, 2020, through RCA Records. Production was handled by 20 Rocket, BLSSD, Coupe, DJ Marc B, Jake One, Lamb, Mojo Krazy, and Young Lord Sean. The album debuted at number 109 on the Billboard 200 in the United States. It was supported by the single "No Go", which was released on January 28, 2020.

Track listing

Personnel
Alverne "Verne" Emmanuel – mixing & recording
Colin Leonard – mastering (track 2)

Charts

References

Young Nudy albums
2020 debut albums
Albums produced by Jake One
RCA Records albums